Vehicle registration plates of the Netherlands are vehicle registration plates issued by the .

RDW vehicle registration plates are assigned bearing the same "number" which is a sequence of characters composed of letters and digits as that is shown on the vehicle's registration document. The numbering scheme used bears no relation to the place of a vehicle's registration or ownership, and numbers–which are issued in strict time order–identify the vehicle, not its owner. Thus, if a vehicle changes ownership, the registration number remains unchanged.

But if the car is a taxi or made before 1977, it will have a blue number plate. Taxis will have a blue number plate because they pay a different amount of tax to let people into the car legally, although if a taxi does not have a blue number plate on it, it is an illegal taxi and will let people into their car illegally; the driver will charge a lesser amount of money to the person in the car.

A  trade plate is a temporary number plate used by motor traders or vehicle testers to save them the cost and time to register and tax every vehicle temporarily in their possession. If somebody has a trade plate on their vehicle, that number plate will be green. (See other formats below)

Earlier schemes
The Netherlands introduced a system of vehicle registration plates on 26 April 1898–the third country in the world to do so, after France in 1893 and Germany in 1896. A plate bearing the number 1 was issued to one J. van Dam, who purchased the first Dutch-built motorcar, which was manufactured at his own Groninger Motor-Rijtuigen Fabriek. Plate numbers stayed with the owner, unlike the present system. From 1906, a new system used the format , where  was a province code and  a serial number. This system lasted until 1951 when the current system was introduced.

Province codes 

 A: Groningen
 B: Friesland
 D: Drenthe
 E: Overijssel
 G, GZ, GX: North Holland
 H, HZ, HX: South Holland
 K: Zeeland
 M: Gelderland
 N: North Brabant
 L: Utrecht
 P: Limburg
 R: so-called "Departementen" overseas areas.

Numbering schemes
The current Dutch license plate system uses black letters on a light-reflecting yellow background, although white reflecting letters on a dark-blue background are allowed for vehicles built before 1977. Since 2000, the blue band with the European flag and NL has been mandatory for all vehicles except vehicles built before 1977. 

Dutch license plates can be formatted as follows:

Nowadays the letters used do not include vowels, to avoid profane or obscene language. To avoid confusion with a zero, the letters C and Q are also omitted and letters M and W are not used because they are too wide.  Letters and numbers are issued in strict alphabetical/numeric order. Thus a Dutch license plate indicates the date of registration of a car, but no information about where in the country the car comes from, or to whom it belongs.

Other formats
With the introduction of the GAIK series, several other formats have been introduced as well. All background colors used are retroreflective.

Recent changes

The license plates have subtly changed shape in 2002 when not only did the letter type (or font) change but also a few other changes were made.
 Combatting fraudulent reports of stolen license plates, license plates are replaced immediately but using the same number. The new license plate is tagged with a small number 1 over the first dash, which is increased with each new plate.
 A blue background is used for taxis.
 White letters on a blue or black background are used for classic cars older than 1 January 1978 and with a registration number in sidecode 1, 2, or 3.
 Black letters on a white background are used for small trailers that hide the car's actual license plate.
 Large trailers, caravans, etc. have now got their black/yellow license plate.
 The letter Y is no longer used for cars, but instead for fast motorboats.
 The letter combinations SDB to SDZ and also SSB to SSZ are not issued because 'SD' and 'SS' (and also SA) continue to have fascist connotations in the Netherlands. However, registrations with the letter combination NSB were issued in 2010, although these were recalled because these were the initials of the Nationaal-Socialistische Beweging.

Current series

Motor cars 
01-DB-BB, registration 1999/2000
01-FB-BB, registration 2000
01-GB-BB, registration 2000/2001
01-HB-BB, registration 2001/2002
01-JB-BB, registration 2002
01-LB-BB, registration 2002/2003
01-NB-BB, registration 2003/2004
01-PB-BB, registration 2004/2005
01-RB-BB, registration 2005
01-SB-BB, registration 2005/2006
01-TB-BB, registration 2006/2007
01-XB-BB, registration 2007
01-ZB-BB, registration 2007/2008 till 75-ZS-KB
01-GBB-1, registration 2008 (no 00-GBB-1 and no 00-GBB-2) (no GVD)
00-HBB-1, registration 2008/2009
00-JBB-1, registration 2009
00-KBB-1, registration 2009/2010 (no KKK)
00-LBB-1, registration 2010 (no LPF)
00-NBB-1, registration 2010/2011 (no NSB)
00-PBB-1, registration 2011 (no PKK and no PSV and no PVV)
00-RBB-1, registration 2011
00-SBB-1, registration 2011 (no SGP and no SDB - SDZ and no SSB - SSZ)
00-TBB-1, registration 2012 (no TBS)
00-XBB-1, registration 2012
00-ZBB-1, registration 2012/2013 till 99-ZXT-1
1-KBB-00, registration 2013 (no KKK and no KVT)
1-SBB-00, registration 2013 (no SGP and no SDB - SDZ and no SSB - SSZ)
1-TBB-00, registration 2013/2014 (no TBS)
1-XBB-00, registration 2014
1-ZBB-00, registration 2014/2015 till 8-ZVK-67
GB-001-B, registration 2015 
HB-001-B, registration 2015/2016 
JB-001-B, registration 2016 
KB-001-B, registration 2016 
(L was reserved for agricultural vehicles but was not used after the Tweede Kamer voted against a proposal for agricultural licence plates. But now sidecode 11 is since 1-1-2021 used for this, see below here)
NB-001-B, registration 2016/2017 
PB-001-B, registration 2017 
RB-001-B, registration 2017/2018
SB-001-B, registration 2018 (SP only SP-001-B till SP-154-P)
TB-001-B, registration 2018 
XB-001-B, registration 2018/2019 
ZB-001-B, registration 2019 till ZV-183-Z
G-001-BB, registration 2019
H-001-BB, registration 2019/2020 
J-001-BB, registration 2020 
K-001-BB, registration 2020/2021 
L-001-BB, registration 2021
N-001-BB, registration 2021/2022
P-001-BB, registration 2022 
R-001-BB, registration 2022 
S-001-BB, registration 2022/2023 (current series, now S-PV)  No S-DB to S-DZ and no S-SB to S-SZ to avoid SD and SS combinations.

Motorcycles 
MB-01-BB, registration 1979/1998
MB-BB-01, registration 1998/2011
01-MB-BB, registration 2011/present (current series, now MS-LK)

Mopeds 
01-DBB-1, registration 2005/2006
01-FBB-1, registration 2006
DB-001-B, registration 2006
FB-001-B, registration 2006/2008
D-001-BB, registration 2008/2011
F-001-BB, registration 2011/2015
DBB-01-B, registration 2015/2020
FBB-01-B, registration 2020/present (current series, now FPB-R) 

D/FBS-01-D to D/FBS-99-D and D/FBS-01-S to D/FBS-99-S is not used, to avoid SD and SS combinations. Also, D/FxS-01-D to D/FxS-99-D and D/FxS-01-S to D/FxS-99-S (x is the second letter, D till Z) will not be used; and this also for D/FSD-01-B till D/FSD-99-Z and D/FSS-01-B till D/FSS-99-Z for the same reason.

Trucks/Lorries (weighing more than 3.5 tons) 
BB-BB-01, registration 1994/2012
00-BBB-1, registration 2012/present (current series, now BVD)  BSD and BSS are both not used to avoid SD and SS combinations.

Trucks/Lorries (weighing 3.5 tons or less) 
01-VB-BB, registration 1998/2002
01-BB-BB, registration 2002/2006
01-VBB-1, registration 2006/2009 (no 00-VSB-1 till 99-VSZ-9)
1-VBB-00, registration 2009/2012 (no 1-VVD-00 till 9-VVD-99)
VB-001-B, registration 2012/2016 
V-001-BB, registration 2016/2019 
VBB-01-B, registration 2019/present (current series, now VTX-S)

VBS-01-D to VBS-99-D and VBS-01-S to VBS-99-S is not used, to avoid SD and SS combinations. Also VxS-01-D to VxS-99-D and VxS-01-S to VxS-99-S (x is the second letter, D till Z) will not be used for the same reason. Also VSD-01-B to VSD-99-Z and VSS-01-B to VSS-99-Z is not be used for the same reason.

Trailers 
WB-00-01, registration 1963/1977
00-01-WB, registration 1977/1983
00-WB-01, registration 1983/1989
WB-01-BB, registration 1989/2000
WB-BB-01, registration 2000/2008
01-WB-BB, registration 2008/2021 
00-WBB-1, registration 2021/present (current series, now WHG)

Semi-Trailers 
OB-00-01, registration 1963/1988
OB-01-BB, registration 1988/present (current series, now OT-VK)

Agricultural Vehicles  
LBB-01-B, registration 2021/present (current series, now LRK-H)

LBS-01-D to LBS-99-D and LBS-01-S to LBS-99-S is not used, to avoid SD and SS combinations. Also in the future, LxS-01-D to LxS-99-D and LxS-01-S to LxS-99-S (x is the second letter, D till Z) will not be used, for the same reason. LPF is not used.

Tractors  
TBB-01-B, registration 2021. TBS is not used. TSD and TSS are both not used to avoid SD and SS combinations. TDS-01-D to TDS-99-D and TDS-01-S to TDS-99-S is not used, to avoid SD and SS combinations. Also TxS-01-D to TxS-99-D and TxS-01-S to TxS-99-S (x is the second letter, F to Z) is not be used, for the same reason. Also TSD-01-B to TSD-99-Z and TSS-01-B to TSS-99-Z is not be used for the same reason.  
T-01-BBB, registration 2021/present (current series, now T-FKH) No T-..-xSD and no T-..-xSS, x is the second letter B to Z, to avoid SD and SS combinations.

And read now also https://www.rdw.nl/particulier/voertuigen/kampeerauto/de-kentekenplaat/het-kenteken-op-de-plaat/uitleg-over-de-cijfers-en-letters-op-de-kentekenplaat  

And see also https://groups.io/g/kentekensnieuwsgroep/topic/hierbij_de_maandelijkse/97296624?p=,,,20,0,0,0::recentpostdate/sticky,,,20,2,0,97296624,previd%3D1677609040989025799,nextid%3D1575135608633572571&previd=1677609040989025799&nextid=1575135608633572571

Special-use license plates

This list is not exhaustive. The Dutch Wikipedia article :NL:Nederlands kenteken contains more exceptions.

Vehicle registration 

Since January 1, 2014, the Netherlands has had an all-plastic vehicle registration in credit card format. This and the driving license (which is the same size) are the only things needed to bring along while driving in the Netherlands. This registration has the same green appearance for every vehicle category, only the information on the card differs. It has a chip with more detailed information about the vehicle. All previously issued vehicle registrations will remain valid until the car changes ownership, or until the owner requests replacement vehicle registration documents. While a so-called overschrijvingsbewijs (a separate document that came with the vehicle registration) was needed previously to sell the vehicle, this has now been replaced with a code. The registration card and the correct code are enough to sell the vehicle, even without the original letter stating the code as issued during the new car registration.

References

External links 

 Nummerplaat.com, latest news and all information about Dutch Licence Plates
 Information in English RDW, the Netherlands Vehicle Authority
 RDW kentekencheck public vehicle registration data
 Kentekenkennis, very comprehensive website 

Netherlands
Transport in the Netherlands
Netherlands transport-related lists
 Registration plates